Michael Hight (born 1961) is a New Zealand artist and illustrator.

Background 
Hight was born in Stratford, New Zealand in 1961.  He graduated with a B.Soc.Sc from Victoria University of Wellington in 1982.  Between 1984 and 1987 he traveled, and lived and painted in London.  He is a self-taught artist, and has been painting since the age of 14.

Hight is the husband of New Zealand poet and children's writer Paula Green and has provided illustrations for several of her children's books.

Career
Hight has been a regular exhibitor since 1984, and has been a full-time artist since 2001.  Hight rose to prominence in the 1990s with a series of profound exhibitions, including Heartland Trinkets (1992–93), In Trust (1995), Seven Rivers (1995), Four Strong Winds (1996) and Maungakakaramea (1998).  In 2002 his Auckland exhibition Omarama/Place of Light sold out prior to the opening.

Hight's work is held in many New Zealand collections, and he has been the recipient of several QEII grants.

Many of Hight's works are of one of two types - realistic portrayals of countryside, often dominated by beehives, or linear abstract works in wax and resin.

References

External links
NZ-Artists profile
Profile on Scoop: Dunedin Arts and Cultural Events February-March 2006

1961 births
Living people
New Zealand painters
Victoria University of Wellington alumni
People from Stratford, New Zealand